Cryptendoxyla is a genus of fungi in the Cephalothecaceae family of the Ascomycota. This is a monotypic genus, containing the single species Cryptendoxyla hypophloia.

References

Sordariales
Monotypic Sordariomycetes genera